James Sanders Holman (February 7, 1804 – December 8, 1867) was a soldier, entrepreneur, and the first mayor of Houston.

Early life
Holman was born in Murfreesboro, Tennessee to Isaac and Polly Anne (Wiggleworth) Holman on February, 7, 1804. When he was about 13 years old, his family moved to Lincoln County, Tennessee. He married a first cousin Martha Wilson Holaman just after he turned 18 years old. He had at least 8 children.

Career

Holman first arrived in Texas in 1834. His brother followed him to San Augustine, Texas, with several family members joining them the next year. Holman participated in the Texan Revolution, and fought in the Siege of Bexar. In 1836, the Allen brothersAugustus Chapman and John Kirby hired Holman as a real estate agent for the paper town of Houston. His signature appears on the city's earliest known map, and also on many early deeds, as he both advertised and sold Houston lots. Late in 1836, Holman organized the Texas Railroad, Navigation, and Banking Company with Augustus Chapman Allen and several others. The First Congress of the Republic of Texas granted the corporation a charter to construct canals and railroads, and to establish a bank after accumulating stock subscriptions of $1 million. The company, however, did not survive sustained political attacks by Anson Jones and the Panic of 1837.     

On June 5, 1837, the Republic of Texas granted a municipal charter to Houston. In a three-way contest for mayor, Holman beat Francis Lubbock and Thomas J. Ward, 12-11-10. After he was elected in August 1837, her served for just three months. After a failed campaign to gain a seat in congress in 1838, he was elected as district clerk of Harris County and served from February 1839 to April 1841.  

During the American Civil War, he served on the Texas State Military Board from 1864 to 1865, a body established to help the Confederacy trade with foreign powers in spite of a blockade from the Union. After the war, he supervised construction of the Houston and Texas Central Railway.

Death and legacy
Holman succumbed to yellow fever in Bryan, Texas on December 8, 1867. The city of Houston named Holman Avenue after him.

References

1804 births
1867 deaths
Mayors of Houston
People from Harrison County, Kentucky
People from San Augustine, Texas
Republic of Texas politicians
Confederate States of America diplomats
American businesspeople